"Colony of Birchmen" is a single by American heavy metal band Mastodon. It was featured on the group's third album, Blood Mountain. The song features backing vocals from Josh Homme, lead singer of the alternative rock band Queens of the Stone Age and former guitarist of Kyuss.

It is Mastodon's first single to reach the Hot Mainstream Rock Tracks chart, reaching #33, and was performed live on Late Night with Conan O'Brien on November 1, 2006. It was also nominated for a Grammy Award for Best Metal Performance, but lost to Slayer's "Eyes of the Insane".

The song's title is a homage to the Genesis song "The Colony of Slippermen." Drummer Brann Dailor has said that The Lamb Lies Down on Broadway, on which "Slippermen" appears, is his all-time favorite album.

The song is part of the Rock Band 2 main setlist and also in Saints Row 2 as a radio song.

A music video was created for the song which features the band performing in a cavern, Ruby Falls, while strange phenomena occur above on the surface in a forest along with people that are associated with the events.

A live XFM version was featured on the Oblivion EP.

Track listing
 "Colony of Birchmen"
 "Iron Tusk" (Live)
 "Naked Burn"

Personnel
 Troy Sanders − bass, vocals
 Brent Hinds − lead guitar, vocals
 Bill Kelliher − rhythm guitar, backing vocals
 Brann Dailor − drums
 Joshua Homme − guest vocals

Notes

2006 singles
Mastodon (band) songs
2006 songs
Warner Music Group singles